Highland Aviation Training Ltd is an Approved Training Organisation at Inverness Airport. Highland Aviation offer CAMO and Aircraft maintenance, including Piper and Cessna Aeroplanes and Autogyro/Rotorsport Gyrocopters.

Highland Aviation provides training towards the EASA/CAA Private Pilots Licence (PPLA), the EASA/CAA Light Aircraft Pilot's Licence (LAPL) and the CAA UK Gyrocopter Private Pilots Licence (PPLG).  It also provides training for the UK CAA IMC rating (EASA IR(R)) and the night rating.

In addition to these ratings Highland Aviation also provides beach landing courses and mountain flying training.

History 
Started in 2009 with a small fleet of Piper Aircraft, Highland Aviation now has 6 aircraft, including two gyrocopters. Highland Aviation currently have over 500 members, growing from a small cabin on what is now the Long Stay Car Park at Inverness Airport, they are now based on the North Apron of the airfield within a state of the art facility.

Experiencing continued growth throughout 2018/19, Highland Aviation became a Part.145 Subpart F approved organisation, allowing them to perform maintenance on a wider range of aircraft. They currently maintain nearly twenty aircraft.

They have received multiple awards for their flight experiences, including a 2019 Travel and Hospitality award.

Mountain flying 
Situated near the Cairngorms and the Scottish Highlands, Inverness Airport is a suitable place from which to explore and learn to fly around mountains. Highland Aviation offers trial flights and training courses in mountain flying.

Ben Nevis, Scotland's highest mountain, extends up to only 4,409 ft allowing pilots to experience mountain flying without having to consider the effect of altitude on aircraft performance.

Beach landings 

Beach landing is illegal in most countries without proper permission.  With many secluded areas with long sandy beaches, Scotland is one of the few regions in the world where beach landings are possible.  Highland Aviation is the only training provider in the UK to offer a dedicated course of beach landing instruction. Most of the course is completed at Barra and Sollas.

Beach landings are accomplished by using a soft field approach with power remaining on throughout the procedure.  This will result, if executed correctly, in a very smooth touchdown with a high nose attitude.  The nose can then be lowered onto the beach gently to avoid digging into the soft sand.

Air Tours 
Highland Aviation offers air tours of varying lengths around the Scottish Highlands. Popular shorter destinations include Loch Ness  and the Cairngorms, whilst Ben Nevis and the Isle of Skye prove popular for longer durations. Flight lengths vary from 20 minutes up to two hours.

Flying Courses 
Highland Aviation has over 60 students enrolled across 14 courses, the majority training towards the grant of a pilot's licence.

EASA Licences and Ratings 

 The EASA PPL(A) training course consists of a minimum of 45 hours flight training and leads to the award of an internationally recognised Private Pilot's Licence. Training is conducted from Inverness Airport in the two-seater Piper PA38 or either the four-seater Piper PA28 or Cessna 172. The Qualifying Cross-Country is flown to Wick Airport and Kirkwall Airport in Orkney. This course is mostly aimed at students wishing to progress on to larger and more complex aircraft or wanting to obtain their Commercial Pilot's Licence.
 The EASA LAPL(A) is a training course leading to the award of a Light Aircraft Pilot Licence, which is accepted across Europe. The training course consists of a minimum of 30 hours flight training and can be undertaken in any of the fixed-wing aircraft. The Qualifying Cross-Country is flown to Wick Airport or Oban Airport. This course is mostly aimed at recreational fliers.
 The EASA Night Rating is a post-licence qualification that allows pilots to fly during the hours of official night. The Night Rating course is five hours and is offered seasonally to both LAPL and PPL holders. Training is conducted mostly at Inverness Airport with a navigation exercise around the local area or to either Wick Airport or Aberdeen Airport.
 The EASA Flight Instructor Course consists of three separate courses, depending on whether the candidate wishes to train as a Flight Instructor, Class Rating Instructor, or add night training privileges to their existing certificate. All three courses are conducted at Inverness Airport.
 The SEP Class Rating course provides training towards the issue of a Single-Engine Piston Rating for existing licence holders.
 The LAPL to PPL conversion course allows pilots holding a Light Aircraft Pilot Licence to convert to a Private Pilot's Licence.

UK National Licences and Ratings 

 The UK PPL(G) training course leads to the award of a nationally recognised gyrocopter Private Pilot's Licence and can be conducted in either the open AutoGyro MTOsport or the enclosed AutoGyro Cavalon. Training is conducted at Inverness Airport and the Qualifying Cross Country is flown to Dornoch Airfield.
 The UK IMC/IR(R) course consists of 15 hours of flight instruction with no less than 10 hours being flown with sole reference to instruments. The course is designed to provide 'get out of trouble' instrument training for pilots. Holders of this rating can act as Pilot-in-Command flying IFR in UK airspace, except in Class A or when taking off or landing if the visibility is less than 1500m.

Advanced Training Courses 

 Beach Landing Course at Barra Airport
 Mountain Flying Course around the Scottish Highlands
 Short-Field Operations Course at Inverness Airport and Longside Airfield.
 Soft-Field Operations Course at Inverness Airport, Dornoch Airfield and Easter Airfield.

Aircraft Handling 
Highland Aviation offers handling services to all domestic and international private and commercial aircraft up to a maximum weight of six tonnes.

Aircraft Maintenance 
Highland Aviation is an approved Continuing Airworthiness Management Organisation (CAMO) which provides maintenance for a wide range of aircraft in the General Aviation sector. The Company has comprehensive hangarage facilities and is an approved dealer for Trig  Avionics.

Night Rating 

Highland Aviation also conducts training for Night Rating, a qualification which can be added on to a Private Pilots License and Light Aircraft Pilots License which allows Pilots to fly aircraft after official night begins. Official night is classed as approximately half an hour after sunset.

IR(R) 

Highland Aviation can conduct Instrument Rating (Restricted) training. IR(R) allows pilots to fly solely on Instruments instead of within Visual Flight Rules.

External links 
National Private Pilots Licence Information
UK Civil Aviation Authority
UK Light Aircraft Association

References 

Flight training
Aviation schools in the United Kingdom